Norstrilia is a science fiction novel by American writer Paul Linebarger, published under the pseudonym Cordwainer Smith. It is the only novel he published under this name, which he used for his science fiction works (though several related short stories were once packaged together as a short novel Quest of the Three Worlds). It takes place in Smith's Instrumentality of Mankind universe, and was heavily influenced by the classic Chinese novel Journey to the West. The novel is in part a sequel to Smith's 1962 short story "The Ballad of Lost C'Mell", featuring some of the same characters and settings.

Plot

Setting
The planet "Old North Australia", or simply "Norstrilia", is the only planet in the Instrumentality of Mankind fictional universe which produces the precious immortality drug "stroon", which indefinitely delays aging in humans. Stroon (or the "Santaclara drug") is harvested from the huge diseased sheep the Norstrilians raise, and has resisted all attempts at artificial synthesis. Since the Norstrilians have a monopoly, stroon sells for astronomical prices, and Norstrilia is fabulously wealthy (wealthier than any other single planet). To safeguard their archaic way of life (resembling Australian ranchers with a British cultural inheritance), the Norstrilians are forced to develop the most advanced defense force and weaponry known (for example, Mother Hitton's Littul Kittons); to protect their culture, imports from other worlds are taxed at rates exceeding 20 million percent, reducing what would be a staggering fortune on another planet to humble penury on Norstrilia itself. They are also forced to cull their young in order to prevent overpopulation (only those who pass the test of the "Garden of Death" are allowed to enter adulthood).

Plot summary
Roderick Frederick Ronald Arnold William MacArthur McBan to the Hundred and Fifty-First, Rod McBan for short, is the last male descendant of one of the oldest Norstrilian families and the heir to one of the best ranches, the Station of Doom. As such, he has been spared the culling three times, though he is generally considered unfit, as his ability to communicate telepathically with other Norstrilians is erratic and unreliable. After his last test—which he finally passes with the aid of a Lord of the Instrumentality and his own freak telepathic talents—he learns that an envious former friend, who suffers from an allergy to stroon and so is condemned to live a mere 150 years or so, seeks to kill him, using the pretext that the test was biased and administered unfairly.

Rod survives one assassination attempt. To escape the danger, he amasses an immense fortune overnight by playing the futures market in stroon, following a plan formulated by his ancient computer (which has certain more-or-less illegal quasi-military capabilities) which was passed down to him by an eccentric ancestor. By the next day, he is the wealthiest person in history. Noticing this, the Instrumentality changes the rules so it cannot happen again, but in typical fashion, lets him keep his money to see what he will do with it. Wild rumors begin to circulate about him. He is believed to have "bought Old Earth" (the home planet of mankind), though the reality of his convoluted financial deals and investments is considerably more complex.

For his safety, Rod is sent to Earth, where his unprecedented fortune quickly makes him a magnet for all manner of crooks and revolutionaries. After a series of adventures among the "underpeople" (animals genetically modified to resemble humans and possessing intellects that sometimes surpass their masters', used as slaves and generally despised) in the company of the bewitching Cat-woman C'mell, he meets their leader, E'Telekeli, an experimental creature of bird origin with enormous psychic powers. In exchange for most of Rod's immense fortune (to be used to campaign for the rights of the underpeople), E'Telekeli and Lord Jestocost, a Lord of the Instrumentality who is sympathetic to the underpeople's cause, send Rod safely back to Norstrilia, after fixing his telepathic disability and providing a psychological remedy for Rod's enemy.

Publication history
Portions of Norstrilia were published as two short novels. The first half appeared as The Planet Buyer in 1964, after a shorter version was published in Galaxy as the novelette "The Boy Who Bought Old Earth". The Planet Buyer was nominated for the Hugo Award for Best Novel.

The second half was also published in shorter form in 1964, in Galaxys sister magazine If as "The Store of Heart's Desire", before seeing posthumous publication as The Underpeople in 1968.

It was not until 1975 that the complete text of the novel was published in one paperback volume. The chief differences between the two versions are:

 Norstrilia has a slightly longer prologue.
The Planet Buyer has additional scenes added to the end of the final chapter, "The High Sky Flying".
The Underpeople has an additional opening chapter, "Lost Music in an Old World". This was largely a synopsis, and is completely omitted from Norstrilia.

The 1995 NESFA Press hardcover edition adds further revisions and corrections to the text, and includes variant texts as an appendix. A few lines from the original magazine texts that had been cut from previous book versions are reinstated for the sake of clarity.

The novel also appears in full (using the revised 1995 text, though without the appendix), in the collection We, the Underpeople (2008), following "The Ballad of Lost C'Mell" and four other related stories.

Reception
Algis Budrys of Galaxy Science Fiction received The Planet Buyer favorably, citing Smith's stylistic ingenuity, and noted that Smith's SF stories "are tesserae in a mosaic ... of a completely realized, seamless structure".

References

Sources
Norstrilia, 1975. Cordwainer Smith, Ballantine Books, 
Norstrilia, 1995. Cordwainer Smith, NESFA Press, 
We the Underpeople, 2006. Cordwainer Smith, Baen Books,

External links 

1975 American novels
1975 science fiction novels
American bildungsromans
American science fiction novels
Ballantine Books books
Novels by Cordwainer Smith